FC Linz was an Austrian football club, based in Linz, Upper Austria.

History

SK VÖEST Linz
It was founded on 30 June 1946 as SV Eisen und Stahl 1946 Linz, a factory squad of the public VÖEST steel company (present-day Voestalpine). In 1949, the team was renamed SK VÖEST Linz.

In 1969, SK VÖEST won the championship of the Regional League Central and was promoted to the Nationalliga, the predecessor of the Bundesliga. The club reached its peak in the 1973–74 season, when they became Austrian champion. Its decline began in 1988, when SK VOEST (without umlaut since 1978) was relegated to the First League (II).

Stahl Linz and FC Linz
While the club managed re-entry into the Bundesliga in 1991, the steel company withdrew funds and the team was again renamed, as FC Stahl Linz in 1991 and FC Linz in 1993. In 1997, due to financial difficulties, the club finally had to dissolve, by merger with its long-time rival LASK Linz.

In the same year, FC Blau-Weiß Linz was founded, which adopted the defunct club's traditions.

Achievements
 Bundesliga
 Champions (1): 1974
 Runners-up (2): 1975, 1980
 Austrian Cup
 Runners-up (2): 1978, 1994
 First League
 Champions (2): 1991, 1996
 Regional League Central
 Champions (1): 1969

European Cup history

References

 
Defunct football clubs in Austria
Association football clubs established in 1946
Association football clubs disestablished in 1997
1946 establishments in Austria
1997 disestablishments in Austria